Charlie Aitken (19 July 1932 – 12 January 2008) was a Scottish professional football player who spent his entire career with Motherwell, making 314 appearances in the Scottish Football League between 1950 and 1966.

Aitken died on 12 January 2008, at the age of 75.

References

1932 births
2008 deaths
Sportspeople from Midlothian
Association football wing halves
Scottish footballers
Arniston Rangers F.C. players
Motherwell F.C. players
Scottish Football League players
Scottish Football League representative players
Scotland B international footballers